Ashley Young (born 1985) is an English footballer.

Ashley Young may also refer to:

Ashley Young (Miss North Dakota), see Miss America 2008
Ashley Young (footballer, born 1990), see List of Scottish football transfers 2008–09
Ashley Young (water polo), represented United States at the 2013 Summer Universiade